Park City Red Wolves SC are an American soccer club in Salt Lake City, Utah competing in the USL League Two. They are an affiliate team of USL League One club Chattanooga Red Wolves The team moved to Salt Lake City beginning with the 2021 season, though they kept the Park City name.

History
The club was founded in 2018 by the Chattanooga Red Wolves to serve as one of their affiliate clubs. The Dalton Red Wolves were formed at the same time, as another affiliate. Both affiliates would operate as U23 teams and play in the fourth tier USL League Two.

Year-by-year

Honors

League
USL League Two
Mountain Division
Champions: 2021, 2022

References

External links
 

USL League Two teams
2018 establishments in Utah
Association football clubs established in 2018
Soccer clubs in Utah
Park City, Utah